Mozambique competed at the 2011 Summer Universiade in Shenzhen, China held from 12 to 23 August 2011. In total athletes representing Mozambique won one bronze medal, in athletics.

Anatercia Quive competed in the women's 100 metres event and Kurt Couto competed in the men's 400 metres hurdles event.

Medal summary

Medal by sports

Medalists

References 

Nations at the 2011 Summer Universiade
Summer U
Mozambique at the Summer Universiade